Thomas Toal (1862–1946) was an Irish politician. He was a Cumann na nGaedheal member of Seanad Éireann from 1925 to 1936. He was elected at the 1925 Seanad election for 12 years and served until the Free State Seanad was abolished in 1936.

A native of County Monaghan, Toal was chairman of Monaghan County Council for over forty years up to 1942. He died at his home at Magherarney House, Smithborough, on 24 January 1946.

References

1862 births
1946 deaths
Cumann na nGaedheal senators
Fine Gael senators
Members of the 1925 Seanad
Members of the 1928 Seanad
Members of the 1931 Seanad
Members of the 1934 Seanad
People from County Monaghan
Irish farmers